This is a list of GPS sporting alumni. The list contains names of notable sportspeople from the Athletic Association of the Great Public Schools of New South Wales.

Basketball

 Jackson Aldridge (Riverview) 
 Grant Anticevich (Newington)
 Josh Green (Kings)
 Isaac Humphries (Scots)
 Jordan Hunter (Riverview) 
 Nick Kay (Newington) 
 Greg MacQuillan (Riverview)
 Craig Moller (SBHS)

 Hunter Madden (Shore)

Rugby union

 Allan Alaalatoa (Newington)
 Des Bannon (Joeys)
 Eric Bardsley (Newington)
 Ben Batger (Kings)
 Al Baxter (Shore)
 Kurtley Beale (Joeys)
 Scott Bowen (Newington)
 Tom Bowman (Scots)
John Brass (High)
 James Brown (Newington)
 Luke Burgess (Joeys)
 Matt Burke (Joeys)
 Adam Byrnes (Newington)
 Will Caldwell (Kings)
 Alan Cameron (Newington)
 Scott Cameron (Scots)
 Alister Campbell (Joeys)
 Chris Carberry (Joeys)
 John Carroll (Newington)
 Ken Catchpole (Scots)
 Mitchell Chapman (Kings)
 Bill Cody (Joeys)
 Dave Cowper (Newington)
 Percy Colquhoun (Newington)
 Peter Crittle (High)
 Tim Davidson (Kings)
 Tony Daly (Joeys)
 Steve Devine (Joeys)
 Bob Dwyer (High)
 Ted Fahey (Joeys)
 Nick Farr-Jones (Newington)
 John Grant (Riverview)
 Alan Gaffney (High)
 Daniel Halangahu (Kings)
 Ben Hand (Kings)
 Daryl Harberecht (Scots)
 Mike Hercus (Shore)
 James Hilgendorf (Kings)
 Aub Hodgson (Newington)
 Jake Howard (Joeys)
 James Hughes (Riverview)
 Bryan Hughes (Riverview)
 Julian Huxley (Grammar & Kings)
 Mitch Inman (Riverview)
 Jono Jenkins (Riverview)
 Jason Jones-Hughes (High)
 Peter Jorgensen (Newington & Joeys)
 Bruce Judd (Newington)
 Darren Junee (Joeys)
 Phil Kearns (Newington)
 Michael Lipman (Joeys)
 Eden Love (Newington)
 Graeme Macdougall (Newington)
 Stuart Macdougall (Newington)
 George Mackay (Newington)
 John Manning (Riverview)
 Bill McLaughlin (Newington)
 Duncan MacRae (High)
 Stirling Mortlock (Kings)
 Dean Mumm (Kings)
 Larry Newman (Newington)
 Bryan Palmer (Newington)
 Tom Perrin (Newington)
 Nick Phipps (Kings)
 Peter Playford (Joeys)
 Roy Prosser (Newington)
 David Pusey (Newington)
 Hugh Roach (Newington)
 Benn Robinson (Kings)
 Joe Roff (TAS)
 Hugh Rose (King's)
 Haig Sare (Shore)
 Brett Sheehan (Joeys)
 John Solomon (Scots)
 Richard Stanford (Scots)
 Marc Stcherbina (High)
 William Tasker (Newington)
 Hugh Taylor (Newington)
 Johnny Taylor (Newington)
 John Thornett (High)
 Richard Tombs (TAS)
 Lachlan Turner (Newington)
 Henari Veratau (Scots)
 Ben Volavola (Newington)
 Phil Waugh (Shore)
 John Williams (Newington)
 Steve Williams (Joeys)
 Marty Wilson (Kings)
 Chris Whitaker (High)
 Colin Windon (Grammar)
 Craig Wing (High)
 Bill Young (Joeys)
 David Horwitz (Scots)
 Andrew Kellaway (Scots)
 Jack Maddocks (Scots)

Cricket

 Jackson Bird (Riverview)
 Albert Cotter (Grammar)
 Alan Crompton AO (Scots)
 John Davison (Riverview)
 Phil Emery (Newington & Shore)
 Edwin Evans (Newington)
 Sam Everett (Newington)
 Adam Hollioake (Joeys)
 Ben Hollioake (Joeys)
 Tom Garrett (Newington)
 Jack Gregory (Shore)
 Stork Hendry (Grammar)
 Stan McCabe (Joeys)
 Alan McGilvray (Newington & Grammar)
 Jonathon Moss (Shore)
 Fred Spofforth (Grammar)
 Johnny Taylor (Newington)
Alan Walker (Grammar)
Sammy Woods (Grammar)

Athletics

 Nigel Barker (Newington)
 Daniel Batman (Scots)
 Jim Carlton (Joeys)
 Nicholas Hough (Kings)
 Patrick Dwyer (Joeys)
 Joshua Lodge (High)
 Morgan McDonald (Newington)
 Evan O'Hanlon (Joeys)
 Josh Ralph (Newington)
 Andrew Ratcliffe (Scots)
 Lachlan Renshaw (Grammar)
 Stephen Wilson (Newington)

Tennis

 Ashley Campbell (Newington)
 Percy Colquhoun (Newington)
 Albert Curtis (Newington)
 Stanley Doust (Newington)
 James Duckworth (Shore)
 Ernest Hicks (Newington)
 Thomas Hicks (Newington)
 Jamie Morgan (High)
 John Newcombe (Grammar & Shore)
 Matthew Reid (Kings)

Rowing

 Mervyn Wood (High)
 Nick Baxter (Shore)
 Daniel Noonan (Riverview)
 Tom Chessell (Newington)
 Joe Fazio (Joeys)
 Francis Hegerty (Joeys)
 Sam Loch (Kings)
 Dominic Grimm (High)
 Nicholas Hudson (Kings)
 Vern Bowrey (Newington)
 James Chapman (Newington)
 Rob Jahrling (Newington)
 Fred Kirkham (Newington)
 Matthew Long (Newington)
 Kim Mackney (Newington)
 Michael Morgan (Newington)
 Steve Handley (Newington)
 Geoff Stewart (Newington)
 James Stewart (Newington)
 Stephen Stewart (Newington)
 Stuart Welch (Grammar)
 Matthew Ryan (Kings)

Alex Purnell (Shore)
Nick Purnell (Shore)

Sailing

 David Forbes (Newington)
 Edward Psaltis (Newington)
 Will Ryan (Riverview)

Rugby league

 Daniel Conn (King's)
 Arch Crippin (Joeys)
 Brian James (Newington)
 Peter Jorgensen (Newington & Joeys)
 Ben Kennedy (Joeys)
 Joel Luani (Newington)
 Taane Milne (Newington)
 Tepai Moeroa (Newington)
 Cameron Murray (Newington)
 Mark O'Halloran (Joeys)
 Jarrod Saffy (Joeys)
 Ben Volavola (Newington)
 Craig Wing (High)
 Angus Crichton (Scots)
 Billy Smith (Scots)

NFL
 Colin Scotts (Scots)

Football

 Daniel Alessi (Joeys)
 Daniel Arzani (High)
 Harry Ascroft (Shore)
 Jonathan Aspropotamitis (Newington)
 Adam Biddle (Riverview)
 Travis Cooper (Kings)
 Nicola Kuleski (Newington)
 Chris Triantis (Newington)

Australian rules football

 Leo Barry (Riverview)
 Ryan Davis (Kings)
 Jack Hiscox (Newington)
 Malcolm Lynch (Riverview)
 Henry Playfair (Shore)
 Dane Rampe (Newington)
 Lewis Roberts-Thomson (Shore)
 Will Sierakowski (Riverview)
 Dan Robinson (Riverview)
 Josh Bruce (Riverview)

Swimming

 Forbes Carlile MBE (Scots)
Andrew "Boy" Charlton (Grammar)
 Michael Delany (Riverview)
 Ernest Henry (High)
Frederick Lane (Grammar)

Waterpolo

 James Clark (Newington)
 Sam McGregor (Joeys)
 Thomas Whalan (Scots)
 Hamish McDonald (Scots)

References

Lists of Australian sportspeople